The Piedmont Limited was a named passenger train operated by the Southern Railway in the southern United States. For most of its life it was a New York—New Orleans train, operating over the same route as the more famous Crescent Limited. The Southern Railway introduced the train on March 12, 1899, and it was known as the crack train of the route until the introduction of the Crescent in 1925. The Southern Railway discontinued the Piedmont Limited in 1967.

Route details 
In its prime the Piedmont Limited operated over the following roads:
Pennsylvania Railroad: New York—Washington, D.C.
Southern Railway: Washington—Atlanta, Georgia
West Point Route: Atlanta—Montgomery, Alabama
Louisville and Nashville Railroad: Montgomery—New Orleans

Major cities served
Aside from the above cited cities, the train served Newark, Philadelphia, Baltimore, Lynchburg, Charlottesville, Greensboro, Charlotte, Spartanburg, Greenville, Gainesville, Mobile and Gulfport.

A spur branch served Birmingham, but this was eliminated by 1964. By the end of that year, the southbound itinerary of the route was cut from running from New York to New Orleans to having Kings Mountain, North Carolina, south of Charlotte, North Carolina as the southern terminus of the route. By late 1966, the train was running from Washington, D.C. to Salisbury, North Carolina in both directions. 

Amid the postwar decline in passenger rail service, the train was eliminated in 1967. Beginning in 1970 the Piedmont train served as a Atlanta-Washington daytime service, supplementing the then-Southern Crescent along its middle leg. In 1975, its southern terminus was truncated to Charlotte. This train was discontinued in 1976; by then its southern terminus had been cut back to Salisbury, North Carolina.

References

External links 

1973 timetable

Railway services introduced in 1899
Passenger trains of the Southern Railway (U.S.)
Passenger trains of the Louisville and Nashville Railroad
Named passenger trains of the United States
Railway services discontinued in 1976
Passenger rail transportation in Alabama
Passenger rail transportation in Georgia (U.S. state)
Passenger rail transportation in Louisiana
Passenger rail transportation in Mississippi
Passenger rail transportation in North Carolina
Passenger rail transportation in South Carolina
Passenger rail transportation in Virginia
Transportation in New Orleans